WXDR-LP is a non-commercial campus radio station licensed to Delgado Community College in New Orleans, Louisiana broadcasting on 99.1 MHz FM and Internet streaming. The station brands itself as Dolphin Radio in reference to the college's dolphin mascot, and airs an eclectic mix of musical genres including rock, hip-hop, blues, country, and jazz, along with syndicated programs. It is operated by the students, faculty and staff of Delgado Community College.

Dolphin Radio began operation in August 2011 on 1610 kHz AM and 96.3 MHz FM under Part 15 of the FCC Rules & Regulations, which allows unlicensed broadcasting at very low power. AM coverage (now off–air) was generally within about two miles of the City Park campus, while the FM signal covered about 50 feet of the Student Life Center.

Delgado Community College applied to the FCC for a Low Power FM (LPFM) license in October 2013 and was granted its license in December 2014.

References

External links
 

Radio stations in New Orleans
College radio stations in Louisiana
Radio stations established in 2014
2014 establishments in Louisiana
Low-power FM radio stations in Louisiana